Edmonton-Ottewell was a provincial electoral district in Alberta, Canada, mandated to return a single member to the Legislative Assembly of Alberta using the first past the post method of voting from 1971 to 1979.

History

Members of the Legislative Assembly (MLAs)

Election results

1971 general election

1975 general election

See also
List of Alberta provincial electoral districts
Ottewell, Edmonton, a community in Edmonton

References

Further reading

External links
Elections Alberta
The Legislative Assembly of Alberta

Former provincial electoral districts of Alberta
Politics of Edmonton